is a Japanese former competitive figure skater. She is a three-time World medalist, a three-time Four Continents champion, the 2003 Grand Prix Final champion, and a five-time Japanese national champion.

Personal life
Suguri was born in Chiba, Chiba, Japan. Her younger sister, Chika, is also a figure skater. Their father was a pilot for JAL and due to his job, the family moved to Anchorage, Alaska when Suguri was three. She is bilingual in Japanese and English.

Suguri graduated from Waseda University. She has a degree in social sciences.

In November 2014, Suguri came out as bisexual.

Career
Suguri began skating at age 5 in Alaska. When she returned to Japan, she began formal training under coach Nobuo Sato, a ten-time Japanese national champion.

In 1994, while visiting the practice rink for the 1994 World Championships, Suguri was taught the triple Lutz jump by Michelle Kwan, who was competing in the event.

1996–97 to 2001–02 
Suguri became Japan's national champion for the first time in 1997. Her second national title came in the 2000–01 season. She went on to win gold at the 2001 Four Continents, becoming the first Japanese woman to win the competition.

In 2001–02, Suguri won her third national title and competed at the 2002 Winter Olympics, where she placed 5th. A month later, she won the bronze medal at the 2002 World Championships behind Michelle Kwan and Irina Slutskaya. Her bronze medal at Worlds was the first medal for a Japanese woman at the World Championships since Yuka Sato won the title in 1994.

2002–03 to 2005–06 
In the 2002–03 season, Suguri won her fourth national title. She was awarded gold at Four Continents and repeated as the bronze medalist at the World Championships, this time behind Kwan and Elena Sokolova.

In 2003–04, Suguri won gold at the NHK Trophy and bronze at Cup of China, thus qualifying for the Grand Prix Final. She stood atop the podium at the Final after defeating Sasha Cohen to become the first Japanese woman to take gold at the competition. Suguri left Sato after the 2004 World Championships after she lost two competitions to Miki Ando, who was also coached by Sato at the time. She moved to Chicago in the United States to train with Oleg Vasiliev in the autumn of 2004.

In the 2004–05 season, Suguri placed fourth at both of her Grand Prix assignments. After placing third at the Japanese Championships, she won her third Four Continents title.  She finished fifth at the World Championships. After the Japan Skating Federation refused to let her continue working with Vasiliev, Suguri returned to Sato and soon after Ando left him.

In the 2005–06 season, Suguri won her fifth national title, competing against Mao Asada and Shizuka Arakawa. She placed fourth at the 2006 Winter Olympics in Turin, Italy, and concluded her season with a silver medal at the 2006 World Championships, having finished second to Kimmie Meissner. She became the first Japanese woman to earn three World Championship medals.

2006–07 to 2009–10 
In the 2006–07 season, Suguri finished fourth at the Japanese championships behind younger competitors Mao Asada, Miki Ando and Yukari Nakano, and missed a spot to the World Championships held in her home country. She competed at the Four Continents Championships but withdrew due to injury after falling on two jumps in her short program. At the end of the season, Suguri left Sato again as she felt overshadowed by Nakano, who was also training with Sato at the time.

For the 2007–08 season, Suguri decided to train in Russia with Alexander Zhulin, who had choreographed her programs in the previous season. Due to Zhulin's marital problems, she had to spend most of her time with Igor Pashkevich. At the Japanese National Championships, Suguri placed third after her short program, but she stumbled in the free program, finishing fourth overall, and, again, she missed a spot on the World Championship team.

During the 2008–09 season, Suguri chose to train with coach Nikolai Morozov in Hackensack, New Jersey. There, she was able to improve her jumping ability. Her first competition of the season was Skate Canada where she placed second behind Joannie Rochette. Her next competition was Cup of Russia, where she led after the short program, then placed third in the free skate, and finished third, overall. At the 2008/2009 Japanese Championships she was 5th after the short program due to a fall on a triple flip. In her long program she landed five triples and scored 121.27 points, winning the long program and placing second overall behind Mao Asada. Suguri made the World team for the first time in three years. She placed 6th at the 2009 Four Continents and 8th at the 2009 World Championships.

Suguri left Morozov in the summer of 2009 to train with Alexei Mishin in Russia, saying she wanted to work on triple/triple combinations and the triple axel. Mishin neglected Suguri and she spent most of her time with Igor Pashkevich. She finished 7th at the 2010 Japanese National Championships.

2010–11 to present 
In March 2011, Suguri stated that she would continue competing the next season, and possibly until 2014. She began working as a regular employee in the Sports Marketing Division at Sunny Side Up and gained a sponsorship at a medical company, Yoshindo.

Suguri was unsuccessful in her effort to reach the 2011–12 Japanese Nationals, finishing 12th in her qualifying competition. She was dealing with an ankle injury. Suguri announced her competitive retirement on November 13, 2014. In 2016, she competed in her first adult skating event.

Programs

Competitive highlights
GP: Champions Series / Grand Prix

2011–12 to 2014–15

1992–93 to 2010–11

Detailed results
Small medals for short program and free skating awarded only at ISU Championships.

 QR = Qualifying round

References

External links

 
 

1980 births
Living people
Japanese female single skaters
Olympic figure skaters of Japan
Figure skaters at the 2002 Winter Olympics
Figure skaters at the 2006 Winter Olympics
World Figure Skating Championships medalists
Four Continents Figure Skating Championships medalists
Asian Games medalists in figure skating
Figure skaters at the 1996 Asian Winter Games
Figure skaters at the 1999 Asian Winter Games
Figure skaters at the 2003 Asian Winter Games
Figure skaters at the 2007 Asian Winter Games
People from Chiba (city)
Waseda University alumni
LGBT figure skaters
Japanese bisexual people
Bisexual sportspeople
Medalists at the 1996 Asian Winter Games
Medalists at the 1999 Asian Winter Games
Medalists at the 2003 Asian Winter Games
Medalists at the 2007 Asian Winter Games
Asian Games silver medalists for Japan
Asian Games bronze medalists for Japan
Goodwill Games medalists in figure skating
Japanese LGBT sportspeople
Competitors at the 2001 Goodwill Games